Gray C. Selby (born  1853) was a farmer, teacher, and state legislator in Mississippi. He represented Marshall County, Mississippi in the Mississippi House of Representatives in 1880 and 1881.

He served with Confederate Army veteran, teacher, lawyer, civil engineer and surveyor Elias Jackson Marett, Winfield S. Featherston, and S. W. Mullins. A “Colored” Republican, he was reported to have fled to Arkansas due to intimidation.

See also
 African-American officeholders during and following the Reconstruction era

References

African-American politicians during the Reconstruction Era
19th-century American politicians
1850s births
Year of birth uncertain
Year of death missing
Members of the Mississippi House of Representatives